Pablo César Leonardo Velázquez Centurión (born 12 March 1987) is a Paraguayan footballer who plays as a striker. He currently plays for 12 De Octubre.

Career
Velázquez began his career in the youth divisions of Atlántida Sport Club. After scoring 45 goals in an under-15 tournament with the team, he joined Libertad in 2003. He scored his first professional goal with the team in his debut on 10 December 2005, against 12 de Octubre.

In 2009, Velázquez was loaned to Rubio Ñu. There, he got the chance to play regularly and seized the opportunity by becoming the top scorer in the Paraguayan Primera División Apertura championship, with 16 goals in 20 games. After this, the Argentine club River Plate tried to sign him in July. However, the transfer did not materialize because the club wanted him on loan at a price well below that set by the owner of Velázquez's transfer rights, Libertad (US$3 million). A few weeks later, the player rejected an offer from CSKA Sofia of Bulgaria. In August, River attempted to sign him again. A deal was close, and the press even confirmed the transfer, but eventually the clubs could not agree on the form of payment. Almost immediately came an offer from another Argentine team, San Lorenzo; this time, River reported that the transfer deadline was due and San Lorenzo had not registered Velázquez.

Velázquez continued his career with Rubio Ñu. In the Torneo Clausura, he scored 10 goals in 19 games, totalling 26 in 39 during the 2009 season. This made him the season's top scorer in the Paraguayan Primera División. After the season, his loan ended and he returned to Libertad.

On 30 December 2010, Velázquez was announced as the new signing of San Lorenzo, of the Argentine Primera División.

After good performances at Libertad, Velázquez was linked to a move to the Mexican side Deportivo Toluca, where the Paraguayan international Edgar Benítez plays. Toluca's coach, the former Paraguayan international and Toluca striker José Saturnino Cardozo, requested Velázquez along with Olimpia's Paraguayan international Richard Ortiz. Other teams that have looked to sign Velázquez are the Brazilian teams Palmeiras and Atletico Paranaense and teams in France and Italy.

International career
Velázquez played the South American Youth Championship with Paraguay U-20 in 2007.

Honours
Individual
Paraguayan Primera División top scorer: 2009
Liga MX Golden Boot (Shared): Apertura 2013

References

Pablo Velázquez ya está a las órdenes del DT de Cerro, lanacion.com.py, 22 June 2016

External links

1987 births
Living people
Sportspeople from Asunción
Paraguayan footballers
Paraguayan expatriate footballers
Paraguay international footballers
Club Libertad footballers
Club Rubio Ñu footballers
San Lorenzo de Almagro footballers
Deportivo Toluca F.C. players
Atlético Nacional footballers
Atlético Morelia players
Cerro Porteño players
Club Necaxa footballers
Club Guaraní players
Club Nacional footballers
Club de Gimnasia y Esgrima La Plata footballers
Club Atlético Banfield footballers
General Díaz footballers
Paraguayan Primera División players
Liga MX players
Argentine Primera División players
Categoría Primera A players
Paraguayan expatriate sportspeople in Colombia
Paraguayan expatriate sportspeople in Mexico
Paraguayan expatriate sportspeople in Argentina
Expatriate footballers in Colombia
Expatriate footballers in Mexico
Expatriate footballers in Argentina
Association football forwards